The 2012 Challenge Bell was a tennis tournament played on indoor carpet courts. It was the 20th edition of the Challenge Bell, and was part of the WTA International tournaments of the 2012 WTA Tour. It took place at the PEPS de l'Université Laval in Quebec City, Canada, from September 11 through September 17, 2012.

Points and prize money

Point distribution

Prize money

Singles main draw entrants

Seeds

1 Rankings are as of August 27, 2012

Other entrants
The following players received wildcards into the singles main draw:
 Eugenie Bouchard
 Dominika Cibulková
 Yanina Wickmayer

The following players received entry from the qualifying draw:
 Lauren Davis 
 Heidi El Tabakh
 Kristina Mladenovic
 Maria Sanchez

The following player received entry as a lucky loser:
 Jessica Pegula

Withdrawals
Before the tournament
 Sofia Arvidsson
 Marina Erakovic
 Camila Giorgi (illness)
 Christina McHale (illness)
 Virginie Razzano

Retirements
 Anna Tatishvili (low back injury)
 Aleksandra Wozniak (right shoulder injury)

Doubles main draw entrants

Seeds

1 Rankings are as of August 27, 2012

Other entrants
The following pairs received wildcards into the doubles main draw:
 Stéphanie Dubois /  Heidi El Tabakh
 Grace Min /  Carol Zhao

Champions

Singles

 Kirsten Flipkens def.  Lucie Hradecká, 6–1, 7–5

Doubles

 Tatjana Malek /  Kristina Mladenovic def.  Alicja Rosolska /  Heather Watson, 7–6(7–5), 6–7(6–8), [10–7]

References

External links
Official website

Challenge Bell
Tournoi de Québec
Challenge Bell
2010s in Quebec City